Northern America is the northernmost subregion of North America. The boundaries may be drawn slightly differently. In one definition, it lies directly north of Middle America. Northern America's land frontier with the rest of North America then coincides with the Mexico–United States border. Geopolitically, according to the United Nations' scheme of geographical regions and subregions, Northern America consists of Bermuda, Canada, Greenland, Saint Pierre and Miquelon and the United States (the contiguous United States and Alaska only, excluding Hawaii, Navassa Island, Puerto Rico, the United States Virgin Islands, and other minor U.S. Pacific territories).

Definitions 
Maps using the term Northern America date back to 1755, when the region was occupied by France, Great Britain, and Spain. The Solemn Act of the Declaration of Independence of Northern America in 1813 applied to Mexico.
Today, Northern America includes the Canada–US dyad, developed countries that exhibit very high Human Development Indexes and intense economic integration while sharing many socioeconomic characteristics.

The World Geographical Scheme for Recording Plant Distributions has "Northern America" as the seventh of its nine "botanical continents". Its definition differs from the usual political one: Mexico is included, Bermuda is excluded (being placed in the Caribbean region), Hawaii is excluded (being placed in the Pacific botanical continent) and all of the Aleutian Islands, Russian as well as American, are included.

Countries and territories 

* indicates "Demographics of country or territory" links.

Demographics

See also 

 Americas (terminology)
 Anglo-America

 Caribbean
 Central America
 Middle America
 Southern Cone
 The Nine Nations of North America
 West Indies
 Western world

References

External links
 Canada and the United States, by Stephen Azzi and J.L. Granatstein

 
1750s neologisms
Regions of North America